Piney Knoll Conservation Area is a protected area of Orono, Maine, United States. Located at the southern end of Marsh Island along the Penobscot River, it is noted as a site for bird-watching as well as local wildlife. It includes 4.5 miles of intersecting trails. 

It was established in 1991 with funds donated by Bangor Hydro-Electric Company as part of an ultimately failed plan to build a nearby dam. In 2010, Land for Maine's Future supported the OLT in purchasing 20 more acres for conservation. The land was formerly a settlement of the Penobscot people as well as port for a ferry to Bradley, Maine.

References

1991 establishments in Maine
Protected areas established in 1991
Orono, Maine
Protected areas of Penobscot County, Maine